Vincent Terrill Williams Jr. (born August 30, 2000) is an American professional basketball player for the Memphis Grizzlies of the National Basketball Association (NBA), on a two-way contract with the Memphis Hustle of the NBA G League. He played college basketball for the VCU Rams.

College career
Before his freshman season at VCU, Williams tore his labrum in his left shoulder and was sidelined until August 2018. As a freshman, he averaged 4.9 points and 3.3 rebounds per game. During the offseason, he suffered a torn right labrum that required surgery and was not fully cleared to return until early October 2019. Williams was limited to 21 games in his sophomore season due to hand and ankle injuries, averaging 4.2 points and 2.8 rebounds per game.

Professional career

Memphis Grizzlies (2022–present)
Williams was selected with the 47th overall pick in the 2022 NBA draft by the Memphis Grizzlies. On July 2, 2022, the Grizzlies signed him to a two-way contract.

Career statistics

College

|-
| style="text-align:left;"| 2018–19
| style="text-align:left;"| VCU
| 33 || 0 || 15.5 || .459 || .240 || .688 || 3.3 || 1.0 || 1.0 || .4 || 4.9
|-
| style="text-align:left;"| 2019–20
| style="text-align:left;"| VCU
| 21 || 3 || 16.4 || .342 || .200 || .806 || 2.8 || 1.0 || 1.0 || .4 || 4.2
|-
| style="text-align:left;"| 2020–21
| style="text-align:left;"| VCU
| 26 || 22 || 28.6 || .414 || .413 || .793 || 5.2 || 2.2 || 1.0 || .2 || 10.6
|-
| style="text-align:left;"| 2021–22
| style="text-align:left;"| VCU
| 30 || 29 || 32.4 || .477 || .387 || .814 || 6.0 || 3.0 || 1.6 || 1.1 || 14.1
|- class="sortbottom"
| style="text-align:center;" colspan="2"| Career
| 110 || 54 || 23.4 || .440 || .367 || .773 || 4.4 || 1.9 || 1.2 || .5 || 8.6

References

External links

VCU Rams bio

2000 births
Living people
American men's basketball players
Basketball players from Ohio
Memphis Grizzlies draft picks
Memphis Grizzlies players
Sportspeople from Toledo, Ohio
Shooting guards
Small forwards
VCU Rams men's basketball players